The 2019–20 Valparaiso Crusaders men's basketball team represented Valparaiso University during the 2019–20 NCAA Division I men's basketball season. The Crusaders, led by fourth-year head coach Matt Lottich, played their home games at the Athletics–Recreation Center as third-year members of the Missouri Valley Conference. They finished the season 19–16, 9–9 in MVC play to finish in a tie for sixth place. As the No. 7 seed in the MVC tournament, they defeated Evansville, Loyola–Chicago, and Missouri State to advance to the championship game where they lost to Bradley.

Previous season
The Crusaders finished the 2018–19 season 15–18, 7–11 in MVC play to finish in a tie for eighth place. As the No. 9 seed in the MVC tournament, they defeated Indiana State in the first round before losing to Loyola–Chicago in the quarterfinals.

Offseason

Departures

In addition to the departing players, assistant coach Todd Townsend left the program after the 2018–19 season, citing family reasons. Matt Bowen, who had spent that season as the Crusaders' director of basketball operations, was promoted to a full assistant position.

Roster

Schedule and results

|-
!colspan=9 style=| Canadian exhibition tour

|-
!colspan=9 style=| Exhibition

|-
!colspan=9 style=|Non-conference regular season

|-

|-
!colspan=9 style=|MVC regular season
|-

|-
!colspan=9 style=| MVC tournament

Source

References

2019–20 Missouri Valley Conference men's basketball season
2019-20
2019 in sports in Indiana
2020 in sports in Indiana